Sumanta Baruah is a cartoonist from India. His cartoons have been published in Current Science, Science Reporter, Resonance, Vigyan Jeuti, Drishti, Satsori, Journal of Assam Science Society, Prantik, Gonit Sora, Enajori and xahitya.org. His cartoons have been exhibited in two International Cartoon Festivals: 3rd Rhodes International Cartoon Exhibition, Greece (2006) and International Cartoon Festival, Iran (2006).

Creations
Sumanta draws cartoons on various topics of science, environment, mathematics, politics and society.

References

Indian cartoonists
Writers from Assam
Living people
Year of birth missing (living people)

External links 

 Sumanta Baruah's TEDx talk "Cartoons for Science, Society and Change"
 Article by The Hindu on Sumanta Baruah's cartoons